Fabbrica Aeroplani Ing. O. Pomilio was an Italian World War I biplane aircraft manufacturer.

The Pomilio series of aircraft (PC, PD, PE and PY) were two-seater scout aircraft. When first introduced in spring 1917, the type was faster than most other machines of its day although instability problems had to be dealt with by subsequent variants. With the completion of the final variant, the Pomilio brothers sold their company to Ansaldo and emigrated to the US.

The Pomilio range of scout planes is known to have served in approximately 30 squadrons of the Italian Air Force.

Aircraft
Pomilio BVL-12
Pomilio FVL-8
Pomilio PD
Pomilio PE
Pomilio PY
Pomilio Gamma
Savoia-Pomilio SP.1
Savoia-Pomilio SP.2
Savoia-Pomilio SP.3
Savoia-Pomilio SP.4

See also

 List of Italian companies

References

Gio. Ansaldo & C.
Defunct aircraft manufacturers of Italy
Italian brands
Vehicle manufacturing companies established in 1916
Italian companies established in 1916